A kei truck, kei-class truck, or Japanese mini truck is a mini truck, a tiny but practical pickup truck available in rear-wheel drive or four-wheel drive versions, built to satisfy the Japanese keijidōsha (軽自動車, "light vehicle") statutory class. They are known as keitora (軽トラ, "light truck") in Japan alongside the microvan.

Design 
The kei truck class specifies a maximum size and displacement, greatly increased since legislation first enabled the type in 1949. They evolved from earlier three-wheeled trucks based on motorcycles with a small load-carrying area, called san-rin (三輪), which were popular in Japan before the war. Due to the limits established with regards to vehicle length, most, if not all, current trucks in this classification are built with the "cab over" approach to maximize load-carrying abilities - the Suzuki Mighty Boy is one of the rare historical exceptions. For export markets, kei trucks are usually fitted with bigger engines to allow them even more carrying capabilities. An Indonesian version of the originally 543-cc Suzuki Carry was built with a 1.6-L unit – nearly three times larger.

Typical manufacturers and model names include: Daihatsu Hijet ,Subaru Sambar, Suzuki Carry, Mazda / Autozam Scrum, Mitsubishi Minicab. Honda has ended production and sales of kei trucks with the end of production of Honda Acty in 2021.
The first kei truck to go on sale was the Kurogane Baby, manufactured from 1959 until 1962.

Many of these have been produced under license abroad, such as the Piaggio Porter. In South Korea, Daewoo and Asia (Kia) produced rebadged Suzuki Carry/Every, and Daihatsu Hijet vans as Daewoo Labo/Damas, and the Asia/Kia Towner.

Gallery

Uses 
Widely employed throughout Asia in agriculture, fisheries, construction, and even for firefighting, used models originally appeared in the US for off-road use typically by farmers and hunters. Due to the progressive tax on used vehicles in Japan, many of the trucks arrive in excellent condition with very low mileage. They generally have  pickup beds with fold-down sides; dump and scissor-lift beds are also available, as are van bodies. The length limitation forces all of these models into a cab-forward design.

While street legal in Japan, kei trucks do generally have the standard equipment required for US roadways such as seat belts, approved lighting (headlamps, tail lights, reverse and brake lights, turn signals), horn and US standard "AS1/AS2" safety glass; they must pass state safety inspections where required. They are approved for use on local roads in several states, while other states do not have any special legislation regarding them. Some controversy has arisen regarding their use on US roadways, largely caused by an outdated report by the nonlegislative American Association of Motor Vehicle Administrators. The report, issued in 2011, raised concerns about the safety and emissions compliance of kei trucks. At the time of the report, available data were limited regarding the vehicles, but the concerns have largely been dismissed, as jurisdictions have become more knowledgeable. Since 2010, many common uses in the US include campus maintenance vehicles, landscape and property maintenance, delivery vehicles, agricultural uses, golf courses, construction sites, small-business transportation and advertisement, and private recreational and homeowner use. Fire departments, ambulance companies, and even some police agencies have incorporated kei trucks in to their fleets due to the extreme versatility, durability, and low cost compared to other utility type vehicles. State legislation passed during 2008 in Oklahoma and Louisiana are the most liberal, prohibiting their use only on interstate highways. Kei vehicles older than 25 years may be imported into the US with very few restrictions.

In the Philippines, many kei trucks and vans have found a second life there as a form of public transportation called "multicabs".

See also 
Kei car

References 

 
Road transport in Japan
Commercial vehicles
Cab over vehicles